The Bottom Brook Granite is a formation cropping out in Newfoundland.

References

Devonian Newfoundland and Labrador